Bratonezh is a rural locality (a village) in Kopninskoye Rural Settlement, Sobinsky District, Vladimir Oblast, Russia. The population was 2 as of 2010.

Geography 
Bratonezh is located 8 km west from Zarechnoye, 27 km southwest of Sobinka (the district's administrative centre) by road. Fedotovo is the nearest rural locality.

References 

Rural localities in Sobinsky District